Melih İbrahimoğlu (born 17 July 2000) is a professional footballer who plays as an attacking midfielder for Admira Wacker on loan from Heracles Almelo. Born in Austria, he represents Turkey internationally.

Club career
In the 2018–19 season, Ibrahimoglu scored 7 goals and made 12 assists for Rapid Wien II, Rapid Wien's reserve team playing in the Austrian third tier. In the following 2019–20 season he made his first-team debut in the Austrian Bundesliga in a 3–3 draw against TSV Hartberg. 

On 23 December 2022, İbrahimoğlu agreed to join Admira Wacker on loan for the second half of the 2022–23 season.

International career
Born in Austria, Ibrahimoglu is of Turkish descent. Ibrahimoglu made two appearances for the Austria U20 national team in 2019. İbrahimoğlu switched to represent the Turkey U21s, and debuted with them in a 3–0 win over Kosovo U21 on 17 November 2020.

References

External links
 

Living people
2000 births
Footballers from Vienna
Turkish footballers
Turkey under-21 international footballers
Austrian footballers
Austria youth international footballers
Austrian people of Turkish descent
Association football midfielders
Austrian Football Bundesliga players
Eredivisie players
Eerste Divisie players
SK Rapid Wien players
Heracles Almelo players
FC Admira Wacker Mödling players
Turkish expatriate footballers
Austrian expatriate footballers
Turkish expatriate sportspeople in the Netherlands
Austrian expatriate sportspeople in the Netherlands
Expatriate footballers in the Netherlands